Bond is an unincorporated community and U.S. Post Office in Eagle County, Colorado, United States. The Bond Post Office has the ZIP Code 80423. Although Bond has never had a sizable population, the town has significant railroad history, and once was a stop for most of the passenger trains along the Denver and Rio Grande Western's main line.

Geography
It is located on the Colorado River, and is at the southern terminus of the Colorado River Headwaters National Scenic Byway.

Railroad

Bond was originally served by the never finished Denver and Salt Lake Railroad as a midpoint to the railroad's eventual terminus in Craig, Colorado. After the D&RGW purchased the rights to connect the two lines, with the intent of having a more direct connection to Denver, Bond became the north end of the Dotsero Cutoff of the D&RGW's main line, with the tracks from Bond to Craig becoming a spur line. Bond remained a stop on the Denver and Rio Grande Western's passenger trains until their last train, the Rio Grande Zephyr was discontinued in 1983.

Climate
This climate type is dominated by the winter season, a long, bitterly cold period with short, clear days, relatively little precipitation mostly in the form of snow, and low humidity. According to the Köppen Climate Classification system, Bond has a subarctic climate, abbreviated "Dfc" on climate maps.

See also

References

External links

Unincorporated communities in Eagle County, Colorado
Unincorporated communities in Colorado